Mahmudabad-e Nasri (also Romanized as Maḩmūdābād-e Nāşrī; also known as Maḩmūdābād) is a village in Banadkuk Rural District, Nir District, Taft County, Yazd Province, Iran. At the 2006 census, its population was 15, in 4 families.

References 

Populated places in Taft County